Daniel Isaac Helmer (born September 27, 1981) is an American politician. He is a member of the Democratic Party. In 2019, he successfully ran for the Virginia House of Delegates in district 40, defeating Republican incumbent Tim Hugo. The majority of the district's population and landmass is located in Fairfax County with a small part in Prince William County.

Military career 

Helmer is a graduate of the United States Military Academy (West Point). While at West Point, he earned a Bachelor of Science degree. He earned a master’s degree at the University of Oxford on a Rhodes scholarship. Helmer served tours in Iraq, Afghanistan, and South Korea; and is a lieutenant colonel in the United States Army Reserve.

2018 congressional election 
In 2018, Helmer was a Democratic candidate for the 2018 Virginia's 10th congressional district election in the United States House of Representatives. According to The Cook Political Report, state senator Jennifer Wexton was “the substantial frontrunner,” and she ultimately won the primary with 42% of the vote while Helmer garnered 12.5%.

In 2017, one of Helmer's campaign videos entitled "Helmer Zone" went viral, reaching number four on the YouTube trending list within 24 hours. The video, in which Helmer spoofed the film “Top Gun” and sang “You’ve Lost That Centrist Feeling,” garnered mixed reactions.

Helmer had been an early and vocal proponent of impeaching president Donald Trump. Another of Helmer's campaign ads sparked controversy by saying, “After 9/11, the greatest threat to our democracy lived in a cave (Osama bin Laden). Today, he lives in the White House (Donald Trump).” The ad led to his sparring with hosts on the conservative talk show Fox & Friends.

Delegate for Virginia's 40th district

Election
In 2019, Helmer was the Democratic nominee for Virginia's 40th House of Delegates district. He ran against Republican incumbent Tim Hugo, who had been in office since 2003. The race broke Virginia's fundraising record for a House of Delegates election, with Hugo and Helmer raising a combined $3.6 million. Helmer won with 52% of the vote.

Political positions

Women's rights 
Helmer supports women’s rights, access to reproductive healthcare, the Equal Rights Amendment, and eliminating taxes on menstrual hygiene products.

Gun rights 
Helmer supports universal background checks, banning high-capacity magazines and silencers, regulating private gun sales, and red-flag laws that law enforcement may use to temporarily remove firearms from persons deemed dangerous to themselves or others.

In May 2018, Helmer purchased a semi-automatic rifle, without a background check in under 10 minutes, at a gun show in Chantilly, Virginia. The video, produced by his campaign, was picked up by major news organizations such as The Hill, The Washington Post, and Vox. In January 2020, Helmer introduced HB 567, a bill that would outlaw all indoor firing ranges in buildings with more than 50 employees in Virginia. Also in January, when gun rights activists descended on Richmond, Chris Hurst and Helmer allowed students representing March for Our Lives to sleep in their Richmond offices in order to be able to participate in gun control advocacy.

Healthcare 

Helmer supports adding a public option to Medicare. In 2019, Tim Hugo, his Republican opponent, claimed that Helmer sought to abolish private insurance, which PolitiFact subsequently indicated was "mostly false."

Labor rights
In 2021, Helmer and twelve other Democrats, supported Lee J. Carter's attempt to repeal Virginia's right-to-work law.

Antisemitic campaign mailer claims

In 2021, Helmer's Republican opponent, Harold Pyon, distributed a campaign mailer to homes in the 40th district, which featured Helmer at a table piled with gold coins. Helmer, who is Jewish, said in the mailer, his nose was also accentuated and his West Point military insignia was removed from his jacket. He claimed the flier exhibited "antisemitic tropes" which distracted from talking about the issues. Pyon's spokesman claimed the mailer was not antisemitic and could be used against any politician who raises taxes.

An opinion article by the Washington Post editorial board claimed the mailer was paid for by the Virginia Republican Party. It also claimed "The antisemitism conveyed by Mr. Pyon’s campaign mailer is classic and blatant. To claim that it was unintentional is to assert blind ignorance of history." While the article said "We have no reason to assume Mr. Pyon, a retired federal worker and former Army medic, is himself an antisemite," it claimed the mailer "fits a recent pattern among Virginia Republican candidates in this fall’s legislative elections." The opinion piece prompted responses from both candidates. Pyon issued a statement through his campaign, saying in part, "How dare The Washington Post Editorial Board make these assertions when I have spent my entire life working to bring communities of all faiths, ethnicities, and backgrounds together, and to stand against discrimination of any kind; especially against members of the Jewish community." While Helmer responded through his campaign, saying in part, "To have someone bring hate to our community. Use images like this, seek to divide us, is not what we deserve as leadership of the House of Delegates."

Electoral History

References

External links
Dan Helmer
Ballotpedia profile

Living people
United States Military Academy alumni
United States Army reservists
1981 births
21st-century American politicians
Democratic Party members of the Virginia House of Delegates